Monte Grande, Michoacán is a rancho (ranch) located in the Mexican State of Michoacán. This rancho has an area of 153.41 square kilometres (0.12% of the surface of the state) and is bordered to the north by the municipality of San Lucas, Michoacán, It sits between the state of Guerrero, and to the west of Huetamo, Michoacán another popular city in the region of Tierra Caliente (Mexico).

Localities 
San Lucas, Michoacán  (The Municipal City)

 Monte Grande, Michoacán

References 

Populated places in Michoacán